Oneirodes sanjeevani is a species of ceratioid anglerfish known by a single specimen which was described in March 2017. The holotype was recovered by midwater trawling in the Indian Ocean at a depth between 380 and 600 meters. It is named in honor of Dr. V. N. Sanjeevan.

References 

Ceratiidae
Deep sea fish